The Big Revue was a Canadian variety television show. It was the first ever production of CBC Television when both debuted in 1952. The show was directed by Norman Jewison and written by John Aylesworth and Frank Peppiatt. The pilot episode first aired on 9 September 1952.

The series was hosted by actress Toby Robins who would later rise to fame as a panelist on Front Page Challenge. It was on The Big Revue that Don Harron introduced TV audiences to his country bumpkin alter ego, "Charlie Farquharson" (who years later would be immortalized on the American series Hee Haw and the Canadian series The Red Green Show.).

External links
 
 Queen's University Directory of CBC Television Series (The Big Revue archived listing link via archive.org)
 The Big Review at Canadian Communications Foundation

1950s Canadian variety television series
1952 Canadian television series debuts
1953 Canadian television series endings
Black-and-white Canadian television shows
CBC Television original programming
1950s Canadian sketch comedy television series